Luna Mortis, formerly The Ottoman Empire, was an American heavy metal band based in Madison, Wisconsin.

The band was formed in late 2001 in Monroe, Wisconsin as The Ottoman Empire. In 2006, the band self-released their debut studio album, Way of the Blade.  In June 2007, Luna Mortis played the first Flight of the Valkyries female-fronted metal festival in St. Paul, MN under their original name, The Ottoman Empire.

In 2008, the band self-released an EP, The Answer: Does Not Exist. That same year, the band changed their name to Luna Mortis and signed a recording contract with Century Media. On February 10, 2009, the band released their debut for Century Media, The Absence, which was recorded in 2008 at the Audio Hammer Studios and produced by Jason Suecof.

In June 2009, the band returned to St. Paul (now as Luna Mortis) for the festival's third installment. Luna Mortis was dropped by Century Media Records in December 2009.

On February 15, 2010, Brian Koenig announced on Luna Mortis' MySpace page that the band had been dissolved and the members would be going their separate ways. On February 11, 2013, The band announced through their Facebook profile that the band would be reuniting in 2013, planning festival appearances and new material. However, after only two shows as a reunited band, the members decided once again to part ways.

In 2015, vocalist Mary Zimmer joined the band White Empress, a new project created by former Cradle of Filth guitarist Paul Allender. Around the same time, guitarist Brian Koenig joined the band Lords of the Trident. Mary later became the singer for a band called Santa Marta.

Musical style
Luna Mortis' musical style is often described as a mixture of different genres. Among the genres used to describe Luna Mortis are melodic death metal, power metal, progressive metal, and thrash metal. The band's vocal style is characterized by Mary Zimmer's use of both clean vocals and growled vocals. Brian Koenig, the band's principal songwriter, states some of his influences were Dream Theater, Joe Satriani, Megadeth, Metallica, Yngwie Malmsteen, and classical music. Mary Zimmer states some of her influences were At the Gates and Carcass.

Members

Final lineup
 Mary Zimmer – Vocals
 Brian Koenig – Guitar
 Cory Scheider – Guitar
 Jacob Bare – Bass
 Erik Madsen – Drums

Previous members
Todd Olson - Guitar, Vocals
Brad Lupo - Guitar
Paul Kline - Guitar
Nick Conti - Bass
Zack Zweifel - Drums
Dusty Weis - Drums

Session members
Frank Grullon - Guitar (Sessions only)
Brian Loomis – drum kit on Way of the Blade

Live members
Chad Novell - Bass
Adam Maltby - Drums

Discography
 Twice Demo (2002)
 Curse of the Sun EP (2004)
 Way of the Blade (2006)
 The Answer: Does Not Exist EP (2008)
 The Absence (2009)

Works prior to The Absence were released under the band's former name, The Ottoman Empire.

References

Musical groups established in 2001
Musical groups disestablished in 2010
Musical groups from Wisconsin
Heavy metal musical groups from Wisconsin
Century Media Records artists